Coleophora sattleri is a moth of the family Coleophoridae. It is found in France.

References

sattleri
Moths of Europe
Moths described in 1995